Fred, Frederic, or Frederick Newton may refer to:

Frederic Newton (1870–1959), Canadian politician from Manitoba
Frederick Newton (1951–1986), Dominican military commander executed for an attempted coup
Frederick Newton (cricketer) (1890–1924), English cricketer
Fred Newton (rugby union) (1881–1955), New Zealand rugby union player
Fred Newton (politician) (1921–1990), Queensland politician
Fred Newton (swimmer) (1903-1992), American swimmer